Dreisbach is a surname. Notable people with the surname include:

Anne Dreisbach, Baptist missionary
Daniel Dreisbach, American author, academic, and attorney
Fritz Dreisbach (born 1941), American artist and teacher
Scott Dreisbach (born 1975), American football quarterback